Aristotelia amelanchierella is a moth of the family Gelechiidae. It was described by Annette Frances Braun in 1925. It is found in North America, where it has been recorded from Oklahoma, Utah, Washington and West Virginia.

The larvae feed on Amelanchier alnifolia.

References

Moths described in 1925
Aristotelia (moth)
Moths of North America